Belfort is a town and commune in France.

Belfort may also refer to:

Locations

Europe
Belfry of Bruges, a bell-tower in Bruges, Belgium
Belfort, Kuyavian-Pomeranian Voivodeship, a village in north-central Poland
Belfort, Pomeranian Voivodeship, a village in north Poland
Belfort-du-Quercy, Lot, France
Belfort-sur-Rebenty, Aude, France
Belfort Castle, a ruined castle in Brienz/Brinzauls, Switzerland

Middle east
Deir Abu Mash'al, the Crusader name for a Palestinian village
Beaufort Castle, Lebanon, also known as Belfort Castle

United States
Belfort, California, a community in Mono County, California
Belfort, Ohio, an unincorporated community

People
Vitor Belfort, a Brazilian mixed martial arts fighter
Belfort Duarte, a Brazilian football player
Prêmio Belfort Duarte, a football award
Jordan Belfort, an American author and motivational speaker

Other
 Het Belfort, a Dutch-language literary magazine, now published as DWB

See also
 Belford (disambiguation)